The Peroniti Church is an abandoned Orthodox Church located in the village of Peroniti (Çamlıköy) in Hopa, Artvin Province of Turkey, close to the border with Georgia. The church was constructed between sixth to seventh century and belonged to Exarchate of Lazica. This chapel is obviously distinguished by its architectural categories from the similar chapels in the eastern Black Sea littoral.

References

Georgian churches in Turkey